Guillermo Alejandro Páez Cepeda (born 18 April 1945) is a former Chilean footballer who played for 6 clubs of Chile and in the Chile national football team in the FIFA World Cup Germany 1974.

Personal life
He is the older brother of the former footballer and manager Juan Páez.

He is the father-in-law of the also former Chile international footballer Mauricio Pozo.

He is also known by his nickname Loco Páez (Crazy).

Honours

Player
Universidad Católica
 Primera División de Chile (1): 1966

Lota Schwager
 Segunda División de Chile (1): 1969

Colo-Colo
 Primera División de Chile (1): 1972
 Copa Chile (1): 1974

Chile
  (1):

References

External links
 Profile at FIFA.com Profile at
 Guillermo Páez at PartidosdeLaRoja 
 Guillermo Páez at MemoriaWanderers 

1945 births
Living people
Footballers from Santiago
Chilean footballers
Chile international footballers
1974 FIFA World Cup players
Club Deportivo Universidad Católica footballers
Coquimbo Unido footballers
San Antonio Unido footballers
Lota Schwager footballers
Colo-Colo footballers
C.D. Aviación footballers
Santiago Morning footballers
Santiago Wanderers footballers
Chilean Primera División players
Primera B de Chile players
Association football midfielders
Chilean football managers
Santiago Morning managers
Curicó Unido managers
Lota Schwager managers
Magallanes managers
Deportes Melipilla managers
Deportes Temuco managers
Rangers de Talca managers
Unión Española managers
Santiago Wanderers managers
O'Higgins F.C. managers
Arturo Fernández Vial managers
Primera B de Chile managers
Chilean Primera División managers
Deportes Iquique managers